Kaligiri is a town in Nellore district in the Indian state of Andhra Pradesh it is the mandal headquarters of Kaligiri Mandal in India.

Transport 
There is a bus station in Kaligiri near the Sangam Road, Kavali Road Kandukur Road, Udayagiri Road intersection. There is also a bus stand in R&B Banglow Bee Said, Kaligiri. From there, Other Depot buses go to Nellore, Kavali, Kanigiri, Pamur, Atmakuru(N), Kandukur, Udayagiri, Vijayawada, Kadapa, Others State Buses Hyderabad MGBS, Banglore, Channai,and other destinations. Railway line, Nadikudi-Srikalahasthi is passing (under construction) through the town.and well connected by road

Near villages 
Velagapadu 7 km
nagasamudram 6 km
AyyapareddyPallem 11 km
Tellapadu 11 km
PathanaPuram 13 km

Villages 
 
There are 23 administrative villages are there in Kaligiri Mandal.
Jirravaripalem
Papanamusilipalem
Venkanapalem
Polampadu
Kammavaripalem
Sidhanakonduru
Tellapadu
Dobugunta
Pathanapuram
Gumprlapadu
Nagasamudram
Verareddypalem
Krakuturu
Krishareddypalem
Chinnaanaluru
Basireddypalem
Gangireddypalem
Narasareddypalem
Peddapadu
Peddakonduru
Yepinapi
Thurpu Gudladona
Ananthapuram
Kaligiri

Near Mandals 
East jaladanki mandal
West vinjamuru mandal
North Kondapuram mandal 
South anusamudrapeta mandal

Demographics 

The total 
population constitute,  males,  females and 
 children, in the age group of 0–6 years. The average literacy rate stands at 
80.31% with  literates, higher than the national average of 73.00%.

References 

Villages in Nellore district